Yvonne Saunders-Mondesire (born 9 October 1951) is a Canadian former track and field athlete. A versatile athlete, she competed in women's pentathlon, long jump, high jump, 400 metres and 800 metres. She competed internationally for Canada, Jamaica, and England during her career.

She was a double medallist for Jamaica at the 1971 Pan American Games and was the 400 m champion at the 1974 British Commonwealth Games for Canada. She competed twice at the Summer Olympics: in 1972 for Jamaica and in 1976 for Canada.

Early life and education
Born Yvonne Saunders in Jamaica, she emigrated with her family to England at the age of eight. Her talent for track and field was identified in her teens while she was at Gorse Park High School in Stretford, Greater Manchester. Competing in the high jump she won the intermediate category at the English Schools' Athletics Championships in 1966 and 1967. She began to expand her oeuvre of events and at the AAA Junior Championships she was the under-17 high jump winner in 1967, then took a high jump pentathlon double in 1968. She represented England at the British Schools International Match, winning high jump in 1967 and 1968. Her international duties brought her to Montreal in 1968 and the family decided to move there that same year.

Career
She moved to Toronto shortly after and began training at Guelph Legion Track Club. Her talents came along with some unwanted attention and she later recounted: "I was also called racist names as I jogged in the city and white parents approached me at meetings pleading that I should allow their daughters to win". The eighteen-year-old Saunders soon made an impact at the Canadian Track and Field Championships by winning a national title double in the high jump and 400 metres. Entering senior competition, she decided to represent her country of birth and in her major debut she placed eighth in the pentathlon at the 1970 British Commonwealth Games. She also helped the Jamaican women's 4 × 100 metres relay team to fifth in the rankings.

At the 1971 Central American and Caribbean Championships in Athletics she won three medals, being individual bronze medallist in the 400 m and long jump and a gold medallist with the 4 × 400 metres relay team. Further accolades followed at the Pan American Games later that year, where she took bronze medals in the individual and relay 400 m events. She was also fifth in the long jump, clearing six metres. Her Olympic debut came in 1972 at the Munich Games. She was a semi-finalist in the 400 m and ran in the heats with the relay team including Ruth Williams, Una Morris and Rosie Allwood.

Saunders qualified for Canadian citizenship in 1972 and began to compete for her adopted home from 1973 onwards. It was in this period that her career hit its peak. A third Canadian national title followed at the 1973 Canadian Championships. She was chosen to run both the individual and relay sprint events for Canada at the 1974 British Commonwealth Games in January and delivered a Canadian record of 51.67 seconds to win the gold medal. She remains the only Canadian woman to have won that title and her run proved to be a lifetime best. She won a second medal with her teammates in the relay, sharing the bronze medals alongside Brenda Walsh, Margaret McGowen and Maureen Crowley. Later that year she set a world indoor best for the 600 metres distance (at 1:18.4 minutes) and she had a 400 m win at the AAA Championships, setting a championship record of 51.90 seconds in the process.

Injuries affected Saunders in the subsequent two years, starting with a herniated back in 1975, then a knee injury. She had a successful appeal to the International Olympic Committee to speed up her citizenship and eligibility to compete at the 1976 Summer Olympics for Canada. With her training interrupted, she was off her 1974 best at the competition. She was eliminated in the first round of the 800 metres and placed a distant eighth in the relay final, running with Margaret Stride, Joyce Yakubowich, and Rachelle Campbell. This proved to be the last global event that she would appear at.

Saunders' form declined after 1976, though she remained in competition. Her last major tournament was the Liberty Bell Classic – held due to the 1980 Olympic boycott – where she was the best of the Western-aligned nations, beating American Robin Campbell and Ann Mackie-Morelli of Canada. She retired from the sport in 1982, having become increasingly disillusioned with the greater role that money and performance-enhancing drugs were having in the sport. She married Dr. Roy Mondesire, a scientist, and the couple had two children. Her younger brother Mark Saunders (police officer) became Chief of the Toronto Police Service in 2015. She was inducted into Athletics Ontario Hall of Fame in 2014 and lives in Boulder, Colorado.

Personal bests
400 metres – 51.67 seconds (1974)
800 metres – 2:00.1 minutes (1975)

International competitions

National titles
Canadian Track and Field Championships
400 metres: 1970, 1973
Long jump: 1970

References

Living people
1951 births
Canadian pentathletes
British pentathletes
Jamaican female sprinters
British female sprinters
Canadian female middle-distance runners
Jamaican female middle-distance runners
English female middle-distance runners
Canadian female long jumpers
Jamaican female long jumpers
British female long jumpers
Canadian female high jumpers
Jamaican female high jumpers
British female high jumpers
Jamaican emigrants to the United Kingdom
British emigrants to Canada
Black Canadian female track and field athletes
Olympic track and field athletes of Canada
Athletes (track and field) at the 1976 Summer Olympics
Olympic athletes of Jamaica
Athletes (track and field) at the 1972 Summer Olympics
Pan American Games bronze medalists for Jamaica
Pan American Games medalists in athletics (track and field)
Athletes (track and field) at the 1971 Pan American Games
Commonwealth Games competitors for Jamaica
Athletes (track and field) at the 1970 British Commonwealth Games
Commonwealth Games gold medallists for Canada
Commonwealth Games bronze medallists for Canada
Commonwealth Games medallists in athletics
Athletes (track and field) at the 1974 British Commonwealth Games
Pan American Games track and field athletes for Canada
Canadian people of Jamaican descent
Athletes (track and field) at the 1979 Pan American Games
Canadian female sprinters
Medalists at the 1971 Pan American Games
Medallists at the 1974 British Commonwealth Games